Rhizostoma is a genus of medium to large rhizostomatid jellyfish found in the East Atlantic Ocean (North Sea and British Isles to South Africa) and Mediterranean Sea.

References

Rhizostomatidae
Scyphozoan genera
Taxa named by Georges Cuvier